Tomura is a genus of sea snails, marine gastropod mollusks in the family Cornirostridae.

Species
 Tomura abscondita Rolán & Rubio, 1999
 Tomura apextruncata Rubio, Rolán & Fernández-Garcés, 2013
 Tomura aqabaensis Bandel, 2010
 Tomura bicaudata (Pilsbry & McGinty, 1946)
 Tomura depressa (Granata Grillo, 1877)
 Tomura himeshima H. Fukuda & Yamashita, 1997
 † Tomura jekelii (Bandel, 2010) 
 † Tomura pacheia Lozouet, Lesport & Renard, 2001 
 Tomura rubiorolanorum Romani & Sbrana, 2016
 Tomura sphaerica Rolán & Rubio, 2008
 Tomura umbiliobsessa Rolán & Rubio, 2008
 Tomura urdunica (Bandel, 2010)
 Tomura xenoskeneoides Rubio & Rolán, 1998
 Tomura yashima H. Fukuda & Yamashita, 1997

References

  Rolán E., 2005. Malacological Fauna From The Cape Verde Archipelago. Part 1, Polyplacophora and Gastropoda

External links
 Gofas, S.; Le Renard, J.; Bouchet, P. (2001). Mollusca. in: Costello, M.J. et al. (eds), European Register of Marine Species: a check-list of the marine species in Europe and a bibliography of guides to their identification. Patrimoines Naturels. 50: 180-213

Cornirostridae